Smoki (Serbian Cyrillic: Смоки) is a well-known puffed corn snack from Serbia, brought to the market by Soko Štark from Zemun in 1972 as the first of its kind in Southeast Europe. It is made of puffed cornmeal grits and flavoured with peanuts and salt. Similar foods in other countries are Bamba in Israel and Erdnussflips in Germany and Austria.

Its popularity (specifically throughout the former Yugoslavia) is such that the name Smoki has become synonymous with any puffed corn snack (also known in these countries as flips).

In September 2006, chocolate-covered Smoki was released, known as Čoko Smoki with the tagline of happy end with new flavours of orange and caramel.

See also
Bamba (snack)
List of brand name snack foods

References

Products introduced in 1972
Brand name snack foods
Serbian brands